Qijiazi Township is a township in Fuxin Mongol Autonomous County, Fuxin, Liaoning, China. It is divided into 9 villages: Qijiazi Village, Jiubeiyingzi Village, Tangtou Village, Qinghe Village, Maolinggou Village, Shichang Village, Baozhuyingzi Village, Haisitai Village, and Shuiquan Village. The township government is located in Qijiazi Village. The total area is 177.3 square kilometers and has 4210 households and 15320 people. The township has 6.4 mu of arable land, 70% of which is sloping land.

References 

Township-level divisions of Liaoning
Fuxin Mongol Autonomous County